There is a significant Roma population in Mexico, most being the descendants of past migrants. According to data collected by the National Institute of Statistics and Geography in 2000, they numbered 15,850, however, the total number is likely larger. In Mexico, they are commonly known as gitanos or rom.

History

The first gypsy group in Mexico were the Spanish gitanos that arrived during the Colonial era. 

Some of the mid-19th century migrants may have arrived to Mexico via Argentina.

In the late 19th and early 20th century migrants from Hungary, Poland and Russia began arriving. In 1931, after a substantial colony of these latter gypsies had settled, and following complaints of delinquency, the law was changed to prohibit further settlement in Mexico.

Culture
In the mid 1900s, Romani caravans were known for showing movies in rural towns (cine ambulante, traveling cinema).

Today, their economic activities mainly revolve around the sale of textiles, cars, trucks and jewelry and also the teaching of singing and dancing. As a result of adoption of Evangelical Protestantism, there has been an almost complete abandonment of fortune-telling as a profession among the Romani of Mexico City.

Notable individuals
 Alfonso Mejia-Arias - musician, writer and politician

See also
 La Lagunilla Market - popular with Romani merchants

Further reading
 D. W. Pickett, "The Gypsies of Mexico", Journal of the Gypsy Lore Society, 1966

References

 
Mexican